The 2016 Generali Ladies Linz was a women's tennis tournament played on indoor hard courts. It was the 30th edition of the Generali Ladies Linz, and part of the WTA International tournaments-category of the 2016 WTA Tour. It was held at the TipsArena Linz in Linz, Austria, on 10–16 October 2016.

Points and prize money

Point distribution

Prize money

1 Qualifiers prize money is also the Round of 32 prize money
* per team

Singles entrants

Seeds 

 Rankings as of October 3, 2016

Other entrants 
The following players received wildcards into the singles main draw:
  Belinda Bencic
  Dominika Cibulková
  Barbara Haas
  Madison Keys

The following players received entry from the qualifying draw:
  Océane Dodin
  Mandy Minella
  Kristýna Plíšková
  Sara Sorribes Tormo

Withdrawals 
Before the tournament
  Sara Errani → replaced by  Mona Barthel
  Anna-Lena Friedsam → replaced by  Anett Kontaveit
  Karolína Plíšková → replaced by  Garbiñe Muguruza
  Barbora Strýcová → replaced by  Denisa Allertová
During the tournament
  Madison Keys

Retirements 
  Mandy Minella
  Garbiñe Muguruza

Doubles entrants

Seeds 

1 Rankings as of October 3, 2016

Other entrants 
The following pairs received wildcards into the doubles main draw:
  Ana Bogdan /  Barbara Haas
  Sandra Klemenschits /  Patty Schnyder

Finals

Singles 

  Dominika Cibulková defeated  Viktorija Golubic 6–3, 7–5

Doubles 

  Kiki Bertens /  Johanna Larsson defeated  Anna-Lena Grönefeld /  Květa Peschke 4–6, 6–2, [10–7]

External links 
 

2016 WTA Tour
2015
Generali Ladies Linz
Generali